Mantokoane Pitso (25 May 1975 – 22 January 2006) was a Lesotho middle-distance runner. She competed in the women's 800 metres at the 1992 Summer Olympics. She was the first woman to represent Lesotho at the Olympics.

References

External links
 

1975 births
2006 deaths
Athletes (track and field) at the 1992 Summer Olympics
Lesotho female middle-distance runners
Olympic athletes of Lesotho
Place of birth missing